d'Étampes de Valençay is a titular family name that may refer to:

Jacques d'Étampes de Valençay
Léonore d'Étampes de Valençay
Achille d'Étampes de Valençay

Château de Valençay 
The Château de Valençay was constructed for the d'Étampes de Valençay family.

Commonly encountered variant spellings

D'Étampes-Valençay
D'Éstampes de Valençay
D'Éstampes
Stamp (surname)